Thiotricha subocellea is a moth of the family Gelechiidae. It is found in most of Europe (except Ireland and most of the Balkan Peninsula), China (Gansu, Shaanxi, Jilin) and Japan.

The wingspan is 10–11 mm. Adults are whitish, marked with grey and black. They are on wing from July to August.

The larvae mainly feed on Origanum vulgare, but occasionally also on other herbs. They feed on the seeds of their host plant from inside a case constructed from the calyxes. During growth, the larva attaches further calyxes.

References

Moths described in 1834
Thiotricha
Moths of Japan
Moths of Europe